The Waybacks is a 1918 Australian silent film directed by Arthur W. Sterry. It is a rural comedy in the vein of Dad and Dave based on a play adaptation of a series of popular novels. Only part of the film survives today.

Plot
The Wayback family visit Sydney from the bush. Dad and his son Jabex make friends with a group of bathing beauties at Bondi. Mum visits a fortune teller.

Cast
Vincent White as Dads Wayback
Gladys Leigh as Mums Wayback
Lucy Adair as Tilly
Louis Machilaton as Jabex
Rose Rooney as Frances Holmes
Harry Hodson as Dan Robins
William Turner as Charley Lyons
George Hewlitt as Nigel Kelvin
Lance Vane as Jack Hinds

Original play

The Waybacks, also known as The Waybacks at Home and in Town, was a 1915 Australian play by Philip Lytton which was adapted from the stories by Henry Fletcher about the comic adventures of a rural family. The play was seen as attempt to cash in on the success of the theatre version of On Our Selection, and enjoyed almost as much popularity at the box office during its original run.

The plot involves the Wayback family visiting Sydney and having various adventures.

Production
Director Sterry previously enjoyed success with The Life Story of John Lee, or The Man They Could Not Hang (1921). He appeared in the original stage production as Charley Lyons.

The film was shot near Windsor and in Sydney. Two of the cast, Gladys Leigh and Harry Hodson, reprised their roles from the stage production.

Release
The film was released in August 1918. The premiere was held at Sydney Town Hall and resulted in a near riot as people sought tickets. The film went on to be a success with the box office. It continued to be seen in cinemas until 1925. It was re-released as The Waybacks of 1925.

Sterry planned a sequel, The Cornstalks, but it does not seem to have been completed.

References

External links
 
 The Waybacks at National Film and Sound Archive
Brief biography of Henry Fletcher
Essay: 'Always Already Out of Date: Australian Bush Comedy' by Bill Routt – discusses The Waybacks
Original production at AusStage

Australian black-and-white films
Lost Australian films
1918 films
1918 drama films
Australian drama films
Australian silent feature films
Australian plays
Australian films based on plays
Silent drama films
1910s English-language films